Thomas L. Long  (November 1860–December 15, 1914) was an American professional baseball player who played one game in the American Association for the 1888 Louisville Colonels as a right fielder. In his single game in the major leagues, Long had three plate appearances, walked once, and struck out once.

References

External links

Major League Baseball right fielders
19th-century baseball players
Louisville Colonels players
1860 births
1914 deaths
Peoria Reds players
Wilmington Blue Hens players
Baseball players from Philadelphia